Aulacocalyx is a genus of flowering plants in the family Rubiaceae. It is found in tropical Africa.

Species
 Aulacocalyx camerooniana Sonké & S.E.Dawson - Cameroon
 Aulacocalyx caudata (Hiern) Keay - Nigeria, Cameroon, Gabon, Equatorial Guinea 
 Aulacocalyx divergens (Hutch. & Dalziel) Keay - Ghana, Guinée, Liberia, Sierra Leone 
 Aulacocalyx jasminiflora Hook.f. - widespread from Liberia to Zambia
Aulacocalyx jasminiflora subsp. jasminiflora 
Aulacocalyx jasminiflora subsp. kivuensis E.Figueiredo - eastern Zaire (Congo-Kinshasa)
 Aulacocalyx lamprophylla K.Krause - Cameroon
 Aulacocalyx laxiflora E.M.A.Petit - Tanzania, Zambia, Zaire (Congo-Kinshasa)
 Aulacocalyx lujai De Wild. - Congo-Brazzaville, Zaire (Congo-Kinshasa)
 Aulacocalyx mapiana (Hiern) Bridson & Figueiredo - Cameroon
 Aulacocalyx pallens (Hiern) Bridson& Figueiredo - Gabon, São Tomé and Príncipe, Zaire (Congo-Kinshasa)
Aulacocalyx pallens subsp. letestui (Pellegr.) Figueiredo - Gabon, Zaire (Congo-Kinshasa)
Aulacocalyx pallens subsp. pallens - São Tomé and Príncipe
 Aulacocalyx subulata (N.Hallé) Figueiredo - Gabon
Aulacocalyx subulata subsp. glabra Figueiredo
Aulacocalyx subulata subsp. subulata 
 Aulacocalyx talbotii (Wernham) Keay - Nigeria, Cameroon, Gabon, Congo-Brazzaville

References

External links
Aulacocalyx in the World Checklist of Rubiaceae

Rubiaceae genera
Alberteae
Flora of Africa
Taxa named by Joseph Dalton Hooker